is a 1964 Japanese film noir directed by Masahiro Shinoda. The film is about Muraki (Ryō Ikebe) a Yakuza hitman just released from prison. At an illegal gambling parlor, he finds himself drawn to a mysterious young woman named Saeko (Mariko Kaga). Though Saeko loses large sums of money, she asks Muraki to find games with larger and larger stakes. The two become involved in an intense mutually destructive relationship. Film critic Roger Ebert gave Pale Flower four stars and put it on his list of Great Movies.

Plot
Muraki, a hardboiled Yakuza gangster, has just been released from prison after serving a sentence for murder. Revisiting his old gambling haunts, he meets Saeko, a striking young upper-class woman who is out seeking thrills, and whose presence adds spice to the staid masculine underworld rituals. Muraki becomes her mentor while simultaneously coping with the shifts of power that have affected the gangs while he was jailed. When he notices a rogue, drug-addicted young punk hanging around the gambling dens, he realizes that Saeko's insatiable lust for intense pleasures may be leading her to self-destruction.

Production
Director Shinoda was influenced by Charles Baudelaire's Les Fleurs du mal while making the film. Shinoda chose the subject of yakuza as he felt the yakuza world is the only place where a Japanese ceremonial structure is sustained.

Release
When screenwriter Masaru Baba saw Shinoda's film focus on visual and sound, he complained to the managers at the company Shochiku. This led to a nine-month delay of the film's release.

Home video
Homevision released a Region 1 DVD of Pale Flower on November 18, 2003. The Criterion Collection released a DVD and Blu-ray edition of the film that features a video interview with Masahiro Shinoda as well as commentary by film scholar Peter Grilli.

Legacy
In 2012, filmmaker Ashim Ahluwalia included the film in his personal top ten (for The Sight & Sound Top 50 Greatest Films of All Time poll), writing: "Why can’t all film noir be like Pale Flower?"

References

Bibliography

External links
 
Pale Flower: Loser Take All an essay by Chuck Stephens at the Criterion Collection

1964 films
Japanese crime drama films
1964 crime drama films
Films directed by Masahiro Shinoda
Shochiku films
Yakuza films
Films about gambling
Films about hanafuda
1960s Japanese films
1960s Japanese-language films